Ipomoea cairica is a vining, herbaceous, perennial plant with palmate leaves and large, showy white to lavender flowers. A species of morning glory, it has many common names, including mile-a-minute vine, Messina creeper, Cairo morning glory, coast morning glory and railroad creeper. The species name cairica translates to "from Cairo", the city where this species was first collected.

Description
A hairless, slim climber with bulbous roots and lignescented base, its leaves are stalked with 2 to 6 cm long petioles. The leaf blade is ovate to circular in outline, 3 to 10 cm long and 6 to 9 cm wide. It is divided into five to seven segments, these are lanceolate, ovate or elliptic, entire and pointed at the tip and base. Often pseudo side-leaves are formed.

The lavender-coloured inflorescences are one to a little bloody cymes. The flower stalks are 12 to 20 mm long, the sepals are 6 to 8 mm long, ovate and sting-pointed. The crown is funnel-shaped, 4 to 6 cm long and violet colored. The stamens and the stylus do not protrude beyond the crown. The ovary is hairless. The fruits are spherical capsules approximately 1 cm in diameter containing one or two hairy seeds. Each fruit matures at about 1 cm across and contains hairy seeds. The vine blooms occasionally throughout the months, but more profusely from spring to summer.

Range
Its exact native range is uncertain, though it is believed to originate from a rather wide area, ranging from Cape Verde to the Arabian Peninsula, including northern Africa, tropical Africa and the Mediterranean. It covers walls, fences or trees, with stems that can measure more than 10 m in length. The altitude at which it has been recorded ranges from 250 to 2250 m.

Invasive species
Because of human dispersal, it occurs today on most continents as an introduced species and is sometimes a noxious weed and an invasive species, such as along the coast of New South Wales. As well as in the United States, where it occurs in Hawaii, California, all the gulf coast states, as well as Arkansas and Missouri. It also occurs in Brazil, where it is used in traditional medicine.

Cultivation
Some plant nurseries sell this plant as an ornamental plant thanks to its showy purple flowers and as well for its fast growth to quickly cover unsightly fences or walls. It can grow as a separate plant if snapped during attempted removal process. The plant causes respiratory symptoms if ingested.

Uses
Most parts of the plant are edible, such as its leaves, which are eaten when young. And its roots, which can be cooked prior to eating. Zulu people use the plant medicinally, where they make a concoction with its crushed leaves and drink it to heal rashes and fever. The plant in some areas is also considered to have antibiotic properties.

Gallery

References

External links

Jepson Manual Treatment

cairica
Flora of Western Asia
Flora of Macaronesia
Vines
Invasive plant species in Australia